Chen Jeng-gang (born 22 April 1925) is a Taiwanese former sports shooter. He competed in the 50 metre pistol event at the 1968 Summer Olympics. He also competed at the 1966 Asian Games.

References

External links
 

1925 births
Possibly living people
Taiwanese male sport shooters
Olympic shooters of Taiwan
Shooters at the 1968 Summer Olympics
Sport shooters from Hubei
Shooters at the 1966 Asian Games
Sportspeople from Wuhan
Taiwanese people from Hubei
Asian Games competitors for Chinese Taipei
20th-century Taiwanese people